Grand Prince Yeondeok (born Wang Hun) or known before as Prince Yeondeok, was a Goryeo Royal family member as the 3rd and youngest son of Duke Gangyang, son of King Chungnyeol. Through his only daughter, he would become the maternal grandfather of King Gongyang. He was once imprisoned after committing adultery with Gim Yeong-jang (김영장)'s widow, but was soon released after his brother exerted pressure on Goryeo court due to the power he had from Yuan.

References

13th-century Korean people
Year of birth unknown
Date of birth unknown
Year of death unknown
Date of death unknown